Roy Percival Bossi (1894–1964) was an Australian rugby league footballer who played in the 1910s and 1920s.

Background
Roy 'Bunny' Bossi was born in Leichhardt, New South Wales in 1894.

Playing career
He joined Western Suburbs in the 1910s and played first grade with them in 1917. He later moved to the St. George District, and turned out for St. George during the foundation year of 1921.

'Bunny' Bossi played in the very first St. George match against Glebe, New South Wales on 23 April 1921 and he retired at the end of the 1921 season.

Death
Bossi died on 22 May 1964 at his Hurstville, New South Wales home, aged 70.

References

1894 births
1964 deaths
St. George Dragons players
Western Suburbs Magpies players
Australian rugby league players
Rugby league second-rows
Rugby league hookers
Rugby league players from Sydney